Xhelil Abdulla (Macedonian: Џељиљ Абдула, Djelil Abdula; born 25 September 1991) is a Macedonian professional footballer who currently plays as a central defender for FK Renova. He is of Albanian origin.

Club career
He signed a three-year contract with Dutch side De Graafschap in summer 2011. In June 2019, Abdulla joined KF Llapi in Kosovo.

International career
He made his debut for North Macedonia in a June 2014 friendly match against China and has, as of February 2020, earned a total of 2 caps, scoring no goals. His second international was the second of two friendlies against China in June 2014.

Honours

Club
KF Shkëndija
 First Macedonian Football League: 2010–11

References

External links

1991 births
Living people
Sportspeople from Tetovo
Association football central defenders
Albanian footballers from North Macedonia
Macedonian footballers
North Macedonia under-21 international footballers
North Macedonia international footballers
KF Shkëndija players
De Graafschap players
MSV Duisburg II players
FK Gorno Lisiče players
FK Renova players
KF Llapi players
Eredivisie players
Regionalliga players
Macedonian First Football League players
Albanian expatriate footballers
Albanian men's footballers
Macedonian expatriate footballers
Albanian expatriate sportspeople in the Netherlands
Macedonian expatriate sportspeople in the Netherlands
Expatriate footballers in the Netherlands
Albanian expatriate sportspeople in Germany
Macedonian expatriate sportspeople in Germany
Expatriate footballers in Germany
Albanian expatriate sportspeople in Kosovo
Macedonian expatriate sportspeople in Kosovo
Expatriate footballers in Kosovo